Hema Sunder  is an Indian film, character actor, television actor, thespian, and lead actor known for his works in Telugu cinema, and a few in Tamil, Malayalam, Kannada, Hindi, and Bhojpuri. He starred in over 300 feature films. He made his debut with the 1972 film Vichithra Bandham.

Awards
Nandi Awards
Nandi Award for Best Actor (1978) - Naalaga Endaro

Filmography

References

Indian male film actors
Telugu male actors
People from Nalgonda
Indian male television actors
Indian male soap opera actors
20th-century Indian male actors
Nandi Award winners